is the thirteenth installment in the Metal Hero Series franchise. It ran from January 30, 1994 to January 27, 1995 for a total of 51 episodes and one theatrical film, aired as part of the 1994 Manga Matsuri, which compiled episodes 1 and 2. Blue SWAT deviated from the Metal Hero trend by using a realistic vibe for the series instead of fantastic, over-the-top action by focusing on the martial arts and gunplay aspects of the series. While the mood of the series appealed to the genre's adult fanbase and older viewers, the show was not well received by children, which resulted in a change into a lighter tone midway through the series. The Blue SWAT team later appeared for a special team-up in the final episodes of Juukou B-Fighter.

Plot

When Earth is tearing itself apart by means of crime, pollution and war, aliens choose the time to invade, taking advantage of the lowering of everyone's guard. The Japanese government establishes an elite police organization known as Blue SWAT to combat the aliens, known as the Space Mafia. The aliens attack by possessing humans to obtain their goals. When an alien possesses the chief of the Blue SWAT unit to infiltrate the organization, it manages to completely demolish their building of operations and murder all but three SWAT members; Sho, Sara and Sig.

Managing to keep the suits and equipment assigned to them, the three form their own private detective-like agency called Blue Research to continue their mission of defeating the Space Mafia. Now working on their own, their battle with the Space Mafia is only beginning...

Characters

Blue SWAT/Blue Research
 : The hot-shot mercenary member of the team in metallic blue armor with blue patches, Sho tends to goof off and act on his own. His Blue SWAT officer number is 153. He is an aspiring Olympic triathlete. Upon obtaining the DrumGunner from Gold-Platinum, he is upgraded to Hyper Sho.
 : The no-nonsense, second-in-command, female member in metallic purple armor with red patches and officer number 077, Sara was a member of the L.A.P.D. before having lost her partner in an incident which she still is deeply bothered by. She demonstrates levelheadedness and often helps to keep Sho in check, and is highly skilled in combat.
 : The leader of the team in gunmetal-grey armor with yellow patches, ID number 011, a calm and intelligent telepath. After being wounded and showing green blood in a battle with an Alien, he reveals that he was part of the Space S.W.A.T., and an alien from a planet devastated by the Space Mafia. Although his identity as an Alien originally results in suspicion from Sho and Sara, he quickly earns their trust. In a twist of events, Gou had a son named Zaji who, comatose after being involved in the same accident as Gou, is being possessed by a member of the Space Mafia named Jisp. Sig is, in truth, 800 Earth years old.
 : A computer nerd who assists the Blue SWAT in their Blue Research group after he was saved by them. He had originally been listening in on the Blue SWAT headquarters, and quickly contacted the three survivors after their base was destroyed. After they saved him from an Alien which had possessed his boss, he began working with them as their analyst and guide for missions.
 : A loudmouth who joins Blue Research as their secretary. She is the only one not initially aware of her employers' role as Blue S.W.A.T.
 : A friendly alien who appears late into the series. After giving Sho a special weapon that allows him to upgrade into "Hyper Sho", he becomes a member of the team.

Space Mafia
An intergalactic crime syndicate of alien invaders. These beings are able to possess or "invade" human beings by force. By doing so, they are able to make quick escapes from host-to-host.

  is a member of the Space Mafia and a major villain in Blue Swat. His first host of choice was a comatose boy named Zaji (ザジ Zaji?), the son of Sig's human host. He later used another host, only known as Monsieur J (ムッシュJ Musshu Jei?).
 , a fang-faced alien armed with a crystal sword and reports directly to Jisp.

Zodor's human host was portrayed by Shinichi Sato (佐藤信一 Sato Shinichi?).

  is another subordinate of Jisp who welds a whip and a head that resembles a parasaurolophus.
 : A female villain with a "drag-queen" humanoid form and a monstrous bird-like winged form. Queen was later revived during the B-Fighter finale by Jagul, who used her as a pawn before absorbing Queen into her body.

Foot Soldiers
Leto, Bona, Goa, and Kell

Goa are black colored types often seen bossing and disciplining the Leto, Bona, and Kell types. Some Goa will either have a whip arm or a blade arm. The most common types of aliens that Blue SWAT encounters, and typically work in packs of three. Each alien liquefies their body and invades a human being via the mouth. Each type can materialize a mini-computer on their arms to communicate with one another. The Bona types can elongate their arms and fingers. The Kell types have the ability to cloak themselves. Once Blue SWAT locates their weak points, the Dictators are sufficient enough to destroy them.

Monsters
The Three Death Killer Brothers (デスキーラ三兄弟 Desukīra San Kyōdai?) Goku, Dou, and Mon, were hired by the Space Mafia to impersonate Blue SWAT and commit crimes to tarnish their reputation. In their latest caper, Mon was killed, but Goku and Dou were able to steal Blue SWAT's armory and kidnap Sumire. Gold Platinum arrived in time to take back the Blue SWAT armor. Goku and Dou were destroyed by the Drumgun Fire. Aliens resembling these three made additional appearances.

Goku (ゴク Goku?) was voiced by Eisuke Yoda (依田英助 Yoda Eisuke?).
Dou (ドー Dō?) was voiced by Eizo Tsuda (津田英三 Tsudo Eizō?).
Mon (モン Mon?) was voiced by Kazunori Arai (新井一典 Arai Kazunori?).

Geruma (ゲルマ Geruma?) is a Space Mafia scientist and warrior that invaded the body of a female earth scientist named Rina Okuyama. When Geruma left Rina's body, the research he working on was accidentally left behind in Rina's mind. Using Rina as bait, Sho planted a tracer on her when Geruma came to abduct her. After collecting his missing research, Geruma was ready to dispose of Rina until the timely intervention of Blue SWAT. Geruma was destroyed by the Drumgun Fire.

Geruma was voiced by Tsutomu Tareki (垂木勉 Tareki Tsutomu?), who previously narrated for Chojin Sentai Jetman.

Mougu (モーグ Mōgu?) is a four-eyed alien with the ability to invade inanimate objects, including Blue SWAT's Dictators. During his first confrontation with Blue SWAT, Sho was accidentally doused with a chemical that would make him explode. To prevent Sho from getting an antidote, Mougu possessed any vehicle and weapon Sho tried to use. Seiji was able to get the antidote to Sho in time while Sig and Sarah fought Mougu. Hyper Sho dealt the final blow and destroyed Mougu with his Dictator.

Mougu was voiced by Wataru Abe (阿部渡 Abe Wataru?), who also voiced the Byakkoshinken from Gosei Sentai Dairanger.

Mademoiselle Eva (マドモアゼル・エバ Madomoazeru Eba?), under Queen's orders, was sent to terminate Jisp for his repeated failures to conquer the Earth for the Space Mafia. Ironically, she was destroyed by Jisp.

Eva was portrayed by Mayumi Tateishi (立石まゆみ Tateishi Mayumi?).

Zaiba

During her tenure with the LAPD, Sarah and her old partner John encountered a Zaiba, which was too powerful against Earth firearms. In their fight, John sacrificed himself to save Sarah. Sig also had history with this Zaiba during his time with Space SWAT. The Zaiba reappeared in present-day and invaded the body of a cyborg called the TR-99 which had a protective barrier to shield the Zaiba from the Dictators. Using gunpowder to set off an explosion, Sarah and Sig were able to damage the TR-99 and locate its weakpoint and destroy it. With the TR-99's barrier out of commission, Sarah and Sig destroyed the Zaiba with their Dictators. Additional Zaiba types appeared with various colored heads.

Yanimi (ヤニミ Yanimi?) is Jisp's third subordinate, armed with a bone scythe. In her human form, Yanimi was capable of utilizing wrestling moves against Blue SWAT. In her last stand against Blue SWAT, Yanimi masqueraded as Otohime from the legend of Urashima Taro to sucker a scientist into helping her create deadly turtles that would latch on to people and explode. Yanimi was destroyed by each SWAT's Dictators

Yanimi's human host was portrayed by pro female wrestler Mitsuko Nishiwaki (西脇充子 Nishiwaki Mitsuko?), credited as MIZKO.

Weapons
  : The standard firearm of each Blue S.W.A.T. member, the Dictator is a semi/auto pistol which is able to be freely switched between the two modes.
 : Cannon weapon which can be mounted on the Interceptors.
 : A special weapon provided to Sho by Gold-Platinum. It allows Sho to upgrade his armor to "Hyper Sho." Can be combined with his Dictator for a finishing attack.
 : A heavy-duty rocket launcher which is used against the Aliens.
 : A large laser cannon weapon.

Vehicles
 : An Autozam AZ-1, equipped with a large-capacity computer, a gas turbine engine and a built-in strategic system. The Blue SWAT's armored patrol car, driven by Sho.
  High speed pursuit motorcycles, ridden by Sig and Sara.
 : A Chevrolet Van driven by Seiji. It has various computers which that allow to communicate and to transmit and receive information to the Blue SWAT personnel. It can analyze the whereabouts of hidden enemies and also access to the satellite SS17.
 : Blue SWAT's recon satellites. It plays an effective role in reconnaissance and tracking from space. Is equipped with a laser cannon, a radar and an electromagnetic wave-absorbing barrier.
 : Gold Platinum's Dimension moving-fortress.
 : A re-entry capsule used when Gold Platinum descended to Earth. Is launched from the Star Fortress.

Episodes
: written by Junichi Miyashita, directed by Makoto Tsuji
: written by Junichi Miyashita, directed by Makoto Tsuji
: written by Junichi Miyashita, directed by Michio Konishi
: written by Junichi Miyashita, directed by Michio Konishi
: written by Junichi Miyashita, directed by Masao Minowa
: written by Junichi Miyashita, directed by Masao Minowa
: written by Nobuo Ogizawa, directed by Kaneharu Mitsumura 
: written by Kyoko Sagiyama, directed by Kaneharu Mitsumura 
: written by Hirohisa Soda, directed by Michio Konishi 
: written by Yasuko Kobayashi, directed by Michio Konishi
: written by Akira Asaka, directed by Masao Minowa
: written by Junichi Miyashita, directed by Masao Minowa
: written by Junichi Miyashita, directed by Kaneharu Mitsumura
: written by Nobuo Ogizawa, directed by Kaneharu Mitsumura 
: written by Hirohisa Soda, directed by Michio Konishi
: written by Yasuko Kobayashi, directed by Michio Konishi
: written by Akira Asaka, directed by Masao Minowa
: written by Mutsumi Nakano, directed by Masao Minowa
: written by Junichi Miyashita, directed by Kaneharu Mitsumura 
: written by Junichi Miyashita, directed by Kaneharu Mitsumura 
: written by Nobuo Ogizawa, directed by Michio Konishi 
: written by Yasuko Kobayashi, directed by Michio Konishi 
: written by Junichi Miyashita, directed by Masao Minowa
: written by Junichi Miyashita, directed by Masao Minowa
: written by Nobuo Ogizawa, directed by Kaneharu Mitsumura 
: written by Kyoko Sagiyama, directed by Michio Konishi 
: written by Junichi Miyashita, directed by Kaneharu Mitsumura 
: written by Naoyuki Sakai, directed by Michio Konishi 
: written by Junichi Miyashita and Yasuyuki Suzuki, directed by Hidenori Ishida
: written by Junichi Miyashita and Yasuyuki Suzuki, directed by Hidenori Ishida
: written by Nobuo Ogizawa, directed by Kaneharu Mitsumura 
: written by Akira Asaka, directed by Kaneharu Mitsumura 
: written by Junichi Miyashita and Yasuyuki Suzuki, Masao Minowa 
: written by Takahiko Masuda, directed by Masao Minowa
: written by Shozo Uehara, directed by Itaru Orita
: written by Yasuko Kobayashi, directed by Itaru Orita
: written by Junichi Miyashita and Yasuyuki Suzuki, directed by Michio Konishi
: written by Junichi Miyashita and Yasuyuki Suzuki, directed by Michio Konishi
: written by Akira Asaka, directed by Kaneharu Mitsumura 
: written by Nobuo Ogizawa, directed by Kaneharu Mitsumura 
: written by Mutsumi Nakano, directed by Masao Minowa 
: written by Kyoko Sagiyama, directed by Masao Minowa 
: written by Junichi Miyashita and Kazuhiro Inoue, directed by Michio Konishi
: written by Junichi Miyashita and Ryu Arakawa, directed by Michio Konishi
: written by Akira Asaka, directed by Kaneharu Mitsumura 
: written by Akira Asaka, directed by Hidenori Ishida
: written by Nobuo Ogizawa, directed by Hidenori Ishida
: written by Nobuo Ogizawa, directed by Kaneharu Mitsumura 
: written by Nobuo Ogizawa, directed by Kaneharu Mitsumura 
: written by Junichi Miyashita and Yasuyuki Suzuki, directed by Masao Minowa 
: written by Junichi Miyashita and Yasuyuki Suzuki, directed by Masao Minowa

Movies
 Blue SWAT: The Movie (compilation of the first two episodes): written by Junichi Miyashita, directed by Makoto Tsuji
Toei Hero Daishugō (compilation of Janperson: The Movie, Blue SWAT: The Movie, and Super Sentai World): written by Kyoko Sagiyama, directed by Katsuya Watanabe

Cast
Show Narumi: 
Sara Misugi: 
Sig/Go Hirose: 
Sumire Asou: 
Seiji Usami: 
Chief Fuwa: 
Gold-Platinum (Voice): 
Jisp (Voice):  (played as )
Mash J: 
Zodor: 
Reeka: 
Yanimi: 
Mademoiselle Q/Queen:  (as 長門 美由樹)
Narrator:

Songs

Opening theme
"TRUE DREAM"
Lyrics and composition: 
Arrangement: Osamu Totsuya
Artist: Tatsuya Maeda

Ending theme
"HELLO THERE!"
Lyrics and composition: Kaoru Itō
Arrangement: Osamu Totsuya
Artist: Tatsuya Maeda

Big Bad Beetleborgs
Mademoiselle Q/Queen made an appearance in the episode "Convention Dimension" in Big Bad Beetleborgs as Wingar.

External links
 

Fictional police officers
Japanese science fiction television series
Metal Hero Series
1994 Japanese television series debuts
1995 Japanese television series endings
TV Asahi original programming